Danillo Villefort (born August 5, 1983) is a Brazilian professional mixed martial artist. Villefort has fought for the UFC, WEC, IFL, World Series of Fighting, and Professional Fighters League fighting in their Middleweight division.

Biography
Villefort was born in Brazil, he was raised in competition, being the son of Vale Tudo legend Francisco "Master Indio" Silva. He was also the god-son of Antônio Rodrigo Nogueira. Villefort is a black belt in Brazilian Jiu-jitsu and has been doing Judo for over 30 years. Villefort is a founder and was a Judo MMA with the Blackzilians for over 6 years. In 2016 Villefort got bronze medal at the Judo Veterans World Championships in Fort Lauderdale. In 2017 Villefort became Champion at Judo US open at the light heavy weight division.

World Extreme Cagefighting
Villefort was set to face Jake Rosholt but Rosholt came down with an injury, the fight would have to be postponed. The WEC then disbanded their middleweight division. Villefort dropped down to 170 and took a fight at WEC 38. He defeated Mike Campbell by TKO in the first round. After the win, the WEC disbanded the welterweight division, Villefort's contract was picked up by the UFC.

In an interview conducted with FightLockdown prior to his UFC debut, Villefort stated, “The greatest moment [of my career] would have to be when I was in the IFL, when I fought Mike Massenzio. At the time I had only recently opened up my first gym and wasn't training enough for that fight. Everyone was saying Massenzio was “gonna kill me”, but I believed in God, in my Judo, and in my Jiu-Jitsu skills, accepted the fight and I did what I did. Massenzio is very strong guy!”

When asked about his post-fight celebration which entails firing an invisible arrow at his opponents, Villefort stated that "it is just a way to do tribute for my Dad, he deserves more than that, but when I shoot the arrow I make him happy!”

Ultimate Fighting Championship
Villefort made his debut for the Ultimate Fighting Championship at UFC 101 against Jesse Lennox. He lost by TKO from a cut, controversial as it was from an accidental headbutt. After the loss, he was released by the UFC.

Post-Zuffa
After being released by the UFC, Villefort signed with upstart promotion, Shine Fights. He was rumored to be fighting Nick Thompson at Shine Fights 3: Worlds Collide, however, the fight never materialized and the event was canceled.

When Drew McFedries was forced to pull out of his bout with Joey Villaseñor at Shark Fights 13, Villefort stepped in for McFedries on short notice. The bout was contested in the middleweight division, a weight class higher than Villefort's normal weight class.  He won via unanimous decision.

Villefort next fought Matt Horwich at Shark Fights 14: Horwich vs. Villefort on March 11 and won the fight by unanimous decision 30-27 on all three of the judges scorecards. In the first round he landed three takedowns and good leg kicks. In the second round, Villefort landed a back elbow which opened a gash under the eye of Horwich and the third round was a similar affair to the first two.

Strikeforce

Villefort was slated to fight Antwain Britt at Strikeforce Challengers 16 in June 2011, but both fighters had to drop out due to injury. He instead fought Nate James at Strikeforce Challengers: Gurgel vs. Duarte on August 12, 2011, in Las Vegas.  He lost the another controversial fight via unanimous decision.

World Series of Fighting
Villefort made his WSOF debut at World Series of Fighting 2 against UFC vet Kris McCray. He won by split decision.

On May 16, 2013, WSOF announced a 4-man tournament to crown an Inaugural Middleweight Champion. Villefort along with former UFC vets Jesse Taylor, David Branch, and current MFC middleweight champion Elvis Mutapčić will be competing in the tournament. Villefort took on David Branch in the opening round at WSOF 5. He lost the fight via unanimous decision.

Mixed martial arts record

|-
| Loss
|align=center|15–6
|Abuspiyan Magomedov
|TKO (punches)
|PFL 3
|
|align=center|1
|align=center|3:37
|Washington, D.C.
|
|-
| Win
| align=center| 15–5
| Thiago Rela
| KO/TKO 
| Final Fight Championship
| 
| align=center| 3
| align=center| 1:04
| Daytona Beach, Florida, United States
| 
|-
| Loss
| align=center| 14–5
| David Branch 
| Decision (unanimous)
| World Series of Fighting 5
| 
| align=center| 3
| align=center| 5:00 
| Atlantic City, New Jersey, United States
| 
|-
| Win
| align=center| 14–4
| Kris McCray
| Decision (split)
| World Series of Fighting 2
| 
| align=center| 3
| align=center| 5:00
| Atlantic City, New Jersey, United States
| WSOF Debut.
|-
| Loss
| align=center| 13–4
| Nate James
| Decision (unanimous)
| Strikeforce Challengers: Gurgel vs. Duarte
| 
| align=center| 3
| align=center| 5:00
| Las Vegas, Nevada, United States
| 
|-
| Win
| align=center| 13–3
| Matt Horwich
| Decision (unanimous)
| Shark Fights 14: Horwich vs. Villefort
| 
| align=center| 3
| align=center| 5:00
| Lubbock, Texas, United States
| 
|-
| Win
| align=center| 12–3
| Joey Villaseñor
| Decision (unanimous)
| Shark Fights 13: Jardine vs Prangley
| 
| align=center| 3
| align=center| 5:00
| Amarillo, Texas, United States
| 
|-
| Win
| align=center| 11–3
| Cassiano Ricardo Castanho de Freitas
| KO (punch)
| Bitetti Combat MMA 6 
| 
| align=center| 1
| align=center| 0:56
| Brasília, Brazil
| 
|-
| Win
| align=center| 10–3
| John Bryant
| TKO (punches)
| C3: Red Rock Jam N Slam 2
| 
| align=center| 1
| align=center| 2:50
| Red Rock, Oklahoma, United States
| 
|-
| Loss
| align=center| 9–3
| Jesse Lennox
| TKO (doctor stoppage)
| UFC 101
| 
| align=center| 3
| align=center| 3:37
| Philadelphia, Pennsylvania, United States
| 
|-
| Win
| align=center| 9–2
| Mike Campbell
| TKO (punches)
| WEC 38
| 
| align=center| 1
| align=center| 3:53
| San Diego, California, United States
| 
|-
| Win
| align=center| 8–2
| Mike Massenzio
| Submission (kneebar)
| IFL: Connecticut
| 
| align=center| 1
| align=center| 3:25
| Uncasville, Connecticut, United States
| 
|-
| Win
| align=center| 7–2
| Brennan Kamaka
| Submission (punches)
| PXC 14: Evolution 
| 
| align=center| 1
| align=center| N/A
| Mangilao, Guam
| 
|-
| Win
| align=center| 6–2
| Todd Carney
| TKO (punches)
| World Fighting Championships 5
| 
| align=center| 2
| align=center| 1:31
| Tampa, Florida, United States
| 
|-
| Win
| align=center| 5–2
| Clayton McKinney
| Submission (kimura)
| Harmful Intent Promotions 
| 
| align=center| 1
| align=center| 3:37 
| Fort Myers, Florida, United States
| 
|-
| Loss
| align=center| 4–2
| Todd Carney
| TKO (punches)
| Absolute Fighting Championships 19
| 
| align=center| 3
| align=center| 2:29
| Boca Raton, Florida, United States
| 
|-
| Loss
| align=center| 4–1
| Rafael Natal
| TKO (punches)
| Gold Fighters Championship
| 
| align=center| 1
| align=center| N/A
| Rio de Janeiro, Brazil
| 
|-
| Win
| align=center| 4–0
| Frodi Hansen
| Submission (rear naked choke)
| Jungle Fight 6
| 
| align=center| 2
| align=center| 0:50
| Manaus, Brazil
| 
|-
| Win
| align=center| 3–0
| Ricardo Dinamite
| TKO (knee and punches) 
| Minotauro Fights 2 
| 
| align=center| 1
| align=center| 1:52
| Bahia, Brazil
| 
|-
| Win
| align=center| 2–0
| Alexandre Lima
| Decision (unanimous)
| Minotauro Fights 1 
| 
| align=center| 3
| align=center| 5:00
| Bahia, Brazil
| 
|-
| Win
| align=center| 1–0
| Beto Ninja
| Submission (armbar)
| Conquista Fight 2
| 
| align=center| 1
| align=center| 4:21
| Brazil
|

References

External links
 
 Archived UFC Profile
 WEC Profile

1983 births
Brazilian male mixed martial artists
Middleweight mixed martial artists
Mixed martial artists utilizing judo
Mixed martial artists utilizing Brazilian jiu-jitsu
Brazilian practitioners of Brazilian jiu-jitsu
People awarded a black belt in Brazilian jiu-jitsu
Brazilian male judoka
Brazilian expatriate sportspeople in the United States
Living people
Ultimate Fighting Championship male fighters
Sportspeople from Brasília